Survivor Africa: Panama is the first pan-regional season of the television show Survivor to air in central or southern Africa and it included contestants from the countries of Botswana, Ethiopia, Ghana, Kenya, Namibia, Nigeria, Zambia, and Zimbabwe. The show was broadcast on the channel M-Net from September 3, 2006 to November 19, 2006 over twelve episodes. The host for the season was Anthony Oseyemi The grand prize was $100,000 US Dollars and was won by  Tsholofelo ‘Tebby’ Gasennelwe.

Contestants

Season summary
The contestants for this season were initially split into two tribes: Embera, named after Panama's semi-nomadic and heavily body-painted tribe, whose buffs were blue, and Kuna, named after a traditionally matriarchal and politically organised people of Panama, whose buffs were red. During the pre-merge portion of the game, Embera won a majority of the reward and immunity challenges, while Kuna saw their numbers dwindle from six to three. When the tribes merged into the Nagual tribe (wearing yellow buffs), their original tribal alliances remained, and the former members of Embera quickly voted out Yaga and Nana, leaving Meti as the only former Kuna member left in the game. Following the elimination of Nana, Tebby approached Meti and Nike about forming an all-girl alliance. This new alliance, along with Jeremiah, voted out Leonard and the leader of the former Embera alliance, Derrick. When it came time for the final four, the contestants competed in two challenges in order to determine the final two. The first of these challenges was the "plank" challenge. As Meti was the first person to fall off the plank, she was eliminated from the game. As Tebby was the last person to fall off the plank, she automatically advanced to the final two. The other two contestants competed in a second challenge which Jeremiah won, advancing him to the final two while Nike was eliminated. Ultimately, it was Tebby from Botswana who won this season over Jeremiah with a jury vote of 5-1.

Voting history

Notes

References

External links
 

Africa
2006 television series debuts
2006 television series endings
Television shows filmed in Panama